Michel'le is the debut studio album by American singer Michel'le. It was released on October 23, 1989, on Ruthless Records, Atco Records and Atlantic Records. The album was co produced by Dr. Dre of N.W.A and André “LA Dre” Bolton The album was certified Gold by the Recording Industry Association of America five weeks after its release.

Commercial performance
Following its release, the record reached number 35 on the Billboard 200 and number five on the Top R&B Albums chart. Five singles were released, "No More Lies", "Nicety", "If?", "Something in My Heart" and "Keep Watchin'". The most successful of these was "No More Lies", which peaked at number seven on the Billboard Hot 100 and number two on the Billboard Hot R&B Singles chart.

New York rapper Tim Dog sampled the song "No More Lies" in his track "Fuck Compton", a diss song towards West Coast hip hop, from his 1991 album Penicillin on Wax. In 2004, P-Dub sampled "Something in My Heart" in his song "4 Walls the After Effect". Song "If?" was sampled in Kehlani's 2014 song "As I Am".

Track listing

Notes
"Silly Love Song" is a cover of "Silly Love Song" by Enchantment (1977)
Samples
"No More Lies" sampled "Funky Drummer" by James Brown (1970)
"Nicety" sampled "Funky President (People It's Bad)" by James Brown (1974) and "Action" by Orange Krush (1982)
"Keep Watchin'" sampled "Think (About It)" by Lyn Collins (1972)
"100% Woman" sampled "Blow Your Head" by Fred Wesley & The J.B.'s (1974)

Personnel
Credits adapted from Discogs

Michel'le Toussaint - lead vocals, backing vocals (tracks 1, 8)
Michael Holmes - backing vocals (tracks 3, 11)
Denise West - backing vocals (track 7)
Karen Foster - backing vocals (track 7)
Vivien Jackson - backing vocals (track 7)
Andre "L.A. Dre" Bolton - keyboards, co-producer
Andre Young - keyboards (track 1), producer, mixing
Donald Tavie - keyboards (track 7)
Bruce "Mal" Malament - piano (tracks 3, 7, 11)
Stan Jones - bass & guitar (track 7)
Dennis Belfield - bass (tracks 3, 11)
Mike Sims - guitar, recording
Ron Krasinski - drums (tracks 3, 11)
Brian Kilgore - percussion
Michael Acosta - saxophone
William Zimmerman - saxophone
Brian Gardner - mastering
Antoine Carraby - mixing
Donovan "The Dirtbiker" Sound - recording
Eric Wright - executive producer
Jerry Heller - management
Elizabeth Barrett - design
David Roth - photography

Charts

Weekly charts

Year-end charts

Certifications

References

1989 debut albums
Michel'le albums
Ruthless Records albums
Albums produced by Dr. Dre
Atco Records albums
Atlantic Records albums